Jack or John Brisco or Briscoe may refer to:

John Briscoe (water engineer) (1948–2014), South African-born environmental engineer
Jack Brisco (1941–2010), American wrestler
Jack Briscoe (born 1991), English rugby league player
John Briscoe (baseball) (born 1967), American baseball player
John Ivatt Briscoe (1791–1870), English politician
John Parran Briscoe (1853–1925), American judge
Johnny Briscoe, American exonerated by DNA evidence
Sir John Briscoe, 1st Baronet (1836–1919)
Sir John Charlton Briscoe, 3rd Baronet (1874–1960) of the Briscoe baronets
Sir John Leigh Charlton Briscoe, 4th Baronet (1911–1993) of the Briscoe baronets
Sir (John) James Briscoe, 5th Baronet (1951–1994) of the Briscoe baronets
Sir John Geoffrey James Briscoe, 6th Baronet (born 1994) of the Briscoe baronets

See also
Brisco (disambiguation)
Briscoe (disambiguation)